David Assouline (born 16 June 1959) is a member of the Senate of France, representing the city of Paris. First elected to the Senate on 26 September 2004, he is a member of the Socialist Party. He is simultaneously a councillor for the 20th arrondissement of Paris.

Assouline is a board member of the France 2 television network and a member of the Digital Dividend Commission (Commission du dividende numérique), which recommended reallocation of frequencies made available by the ending of analogue broadcasting. Previously he has served as a member of the French Group of the Inter-Parliamentary Union and as a member of the Women's Rights and Equal Opportunity Commission (Délégation aux droits des femmes et à l'égalité des chances entre les hommes et les femmes).

Works (with Mehdi Lallaoui)
Assouline is a historian who has written a 3-volume survey of France's relationship with its immigrants. However, he is best known for his work on the harsh repression of Algerians living in France during the Algerian War.
Un siècle d’immigration, Au Nom de la Mémoire (ANM)
 1996, Vol. 1: Un siècle d'immigrations en France (1851–1918), 144 pp., 
 1996, Vol. 2: Un siècle d'immigrations en France (1919–1945), 144 pp., 
 1997, Vol. 3: Un siècle d'immigrations en France (de 1945 à nos jours), 144 pp., 
 2001: A propos d’octobre 1961, Au Nom de la Mémoire

Notes

External links

 Blog
 David Assouline (Sénat)
 Page on the Senate website

1959 births
Living people
People from Sefrou
20th-century Moroccan Jews
Jewish French politicians
Internationalist Communist Organisation politicians
Revolutionary Communist League (France) politicians
Socialist Party (France) politicians
French Senators of the Fifth Republic
Moroccan emigrants to France
French people of Moroccan-Jewish descent
Senators of Paris